Rana Mubashir is a Pakistani television news journalist, talk show host and analyst who is known for his current affairs show 'Aaj Rana Mubashir Kay Sath'.

He focuses on Pakistani politics and has interviewed a number of high-profile personalities, both within and outside of Pakistan. Rana has specialized in investigative reporting and has worked as a current affairs consultant and news director.

Early life and education

Mubashir used to live in Pakistan's capital, Islamabad, where he completed his early education, and then joined Quaid-i-Azam University, Islamabad for his master's degree in Defence & Strategic Studies.

Career in journalism
Mubashir has been a journalist for over twenty eight years. He started his career in journalism as a trainee with the Pakistan Observer newspaper and later with the Jang Group of Newspapers as a staff reporter from 1990 to 2006. During his career, he conducted investigative reporting and wrote various investigative stories. He has also worked at PTV. He also served as Director News and Anchor/Host at News One (Pakistani TV channel) TV channel Pakistan until 2011.

In 2020, he works for Aaj News. Before this until 2011, he used to host two current affair programs - "Rana Mubashir at Prime Time" at News One (Pakistani TV channel) channel.

Facing threats
During his career in investigative journalism, he faced some hardships while highlighting social and human rights issues in Pakistan. He was allegedly manhandled by doctors and other hospital staff,  when he tried to highlight patient issues in Rawalpindi's state-run Shaheed Benazir Bhutto Hospital. In one program, he exposed the alleged corruption of Chairman, Evacuee Trust Property Board, Asif Hashmi which offended some people.

Suisse secrets
Rana and his wife Irum were exposed in the 2022 Suisse secrets leak, in which they were reported to have an account active from 2008 to 2011. The account held over one million dollars in May 2010.

References

External links
 Rana Mubashir's Talk Shows on News One

1967 births
Living people
Punjabi people
Pakistani television journalists
Pakistani television talk show hosts
People from Islamabad
Quaid-i-Azam University alumni